General elections were held in Uruguay on 25 October 2009 alongside a two-part referendum. As no candidate for president received more than 50% of the vote, a second round was held on 29 November between the top two candidates, José Mujica of the ruling Broad Front (who received 48% of the vote) and Luis Alberto Lacalle of the National Party (29%). Mujica won the run-off with 55% of the vote.

In the parliamentary elections, the Broad Front retained its majorities in both chambers, winning 16 of the 30 seats in the senators and 50 of the 99 seats in the Chamber of Deputies. The National Party finished second with 9 senators and 30 deputies, the Colorado Party third with 5 Senators and 17 Deputies, and the Independent Party fourth with 2 deputies.

Presidential candidates
Presidential primaries were held on 28 June to select the candidates.

Results
Analysts indicated that Mujica won largely because of the popularity of the Broad Front and incumbent President Tabaré Vázquez's pro-business policies that had strengthened the country's economy. After taking office in 2005, Vazquez cut the unemployment rate from 12.3 to 7.3 percent, encouraged trade and foreign investment, increased wages and social spending, and boosted the central bank reserves and the country's credit rating.

The Broad Front retained a majority in parliament with 15 senators (plus Danilo Astori, later elected vice-president and thus president of the General Assembly) out of a total of 30 and 50 deputies out of a total of 99. The National Party came in second with 9 senators and 30 deputies. Both parties lost votes and legislative seats in comparison with 2004. The historically dominant Colorado made gains and increased its representation to 5 senators and 17 deputies. Finally, the Independent Party did not achieve its main goal of winning a seat in the Senate, but obtained 2 seats in the lower chamber.

Pedro Bordaberry led the Colorado Party to a notable electoral recovery, practically doubling its votes cast in 2004. The Independent Party, with candidates Pablo Mieres and Iván Posada, gained an additional seat in the Chamber of Deputies. Popular Assembly, a small, new extreme left party, did not win much support.

By department

Notes

References

External links

Uruguay
General election
Elections in Uruguay
Uruguay
Uruguay
José Mujica